Suikerfreule  is a 1935 Dutch film directed by Haro van Peski.

Cast
Johan Elsensohn	... 	Dirk van der Kooy
Louis De Bree	... 	Schuit
Annie Van Duyn	... 	Dolly van der Kooy
Louis Borel	... 	Hans Vermeer
Elias van Praag		
Mien Duymaer Van Twist		
Corry Vonk

External links 
 

1935 films
Dutch black-and-white films
Dutch drama films
1935 drama films
1930s Dutch-language films